Uruguay competed at the 1932 Summer Olympics in Los Angeles, United States.

Medalists

Rowing

Men

Art competitions

References
Montevideo.com

Nations at the 1932 Summer Olympics
1932
1932 in Uruguayan sport